Burnt Forest is a town in Uasin Gishu County, Kenya.

History
In the 1960s, forested land in what is now the town of Burnt Forest was cleared to make way for farms.

The town was has suffered ethnic clashes after the 1992, 1997 and 2007 Kenyan presidential elections.

References 

Populated places in Uasin Gishu County